Richard Nicolás Paredes Moraga (born 4 December 1997) is a Chilean footballer who plays as a forward for Chilean Primera División side Deportes La Serena.

Club career
After attending to a massive test, Paredes came to Palestino Youth Team on 2014, making his professional debut on April 25, 2015, in a Chilean Primera División match against Unión Española. Playing for Palestino, he made appearances in both Copa Sudamericana and Copa Libertadores. On 2018, he was loaned to Chilean Segunda División side Deportes Recoleta and to Deportes La Serena in the Primera B on 2019. Along with La Serena, he got the promotion to the 2020 Chilean Primera División.

After ending his loan from Palestino, in April 2021 he renewed his contract with Deportes La Serena on a deal for three seasons.

International career
Along with Chile U20, he won the L'Alcúdia Tournament in 2015.

He represented Chile U20 at the 2017 South American U-20 Championship, making three appearances.

Honours
Chile U20
 L'Alcúdia International Tournament (1): 2015

References

External links

Richard Paredes at playmakerstats.com (English version of ceroacero.es)

1997 births
Living people
Footballers from Santiago
Chilean footballers
Chile under-20 international footballers
Club Deportivo Palestino footballers
Deportes Recoleta footballers
Deportes La Serena footballers
Chilean Primera División players
Segunda División Profesional de Chile players
Primera B de Chile players
Association football forwards